The bowling competitions at the 2017 Southeast Asian Games in Kuala Lumpur were held at Sunway Mega Lanes in Selangor.

The 2017 Games will feature competitions in eleven events (men 5 events, women 5 events and mixed 1 events).

Events
The following events will be contested:

Schedule

Participation

Participating nations

Medal summary

Medal table

Men's events

Women's events

Mixed events

See also
Bowling at the 2017 ASEAN Para Games

References

External links
  

2017 Southeast Asian Games events
2017
Southeast Asian Games